The Journal of Media Psychology is a quarterly peer-reviewed academic journal covering media psychology. It was established in 1989 as the Zeitschrift für Medienpsychologie and obtained its current name in 2008. It is published by Hogrefe. The most recent editor was Christoph Klimmt (Hanover University of Music, Drama, and Media), and the current editor-in-chief is Nicholas David Bowman (S.I. Newhouse School of Public Communications, Syracuse University). In 2022, the journal's impact factor was 2.310, with a five-year impact factor of 3.479.

Abstracting and indexing 
The journal is abstracted and indexed in Current Contents/Social and Behavioral Sciences, Social Sciences Citation Index, International Bibliography of Periodical Literature, PsycINFO, PsycLIT, and Scopus.

External links 
 
 Online Access

Applied psychology journals
Quarterly journals
Media studies journals
Publications established in 1989
English-language journals
Hogrefe Publishing academic journals